You Hear It First was an on-air MTV News program from 2001 to 2007 that gave the MTV audience a first look at hot emerging artists.  Past You Hear It First artists that went on to success include:  

Kanye West
Alicia Keys
Coldplay
John Legend
The Killers
The Pink Spiders
The Click Five
Bloc Party
Cute Is What We Aim For
Franz Ferdinand
The Game
Taproot
My Chemical Romance
Fall Out Boy
Rihanna
Ne-Yo
Chris Brown
Paramore
The Jonas Brothers
Robin Thicke
Sean Paul
Young Jeezy
Lily Allen
Joss Stone
Silversun Pickups
Arctic Monkeys
t.A.T.u.
Tally Hall

References

MTV News